An integral bilinear form is a bilinear functional that belongs to the continuous dual space of , the injective tensor product of the locally convex topological vector spaces (TVSs) X and Y. An integral linear operator is a continuous linear operator that arises in a canonical way from an integral bilinear form. 

These maps play an important role in the theory of nuclear spaces and nuclear maps.

Definition - Integral forms as the dual of the injective tensor product 

Let X and Y be locally convex TVSs, let  denote the projective tensor product,  denote its completion, let  denote the injective tensor product, and  denote its completion. 
Suppose that  denotes the TVS-embedding of  into its completion and let  be its transpose, which is a vector space-isomorphism.

Let  denote the identity map and  denote its transpose, which is a continuous injection. The following theorem justifies the word integral.

Integral linear maps 

It follows that an integral map  is of the form: 
 
The above integral is the weak integral, so the equality holds if and only if for every , . 

A continuous map  is called integral if its associated bilinear form is an integral bilinear form. An integral map  is of the form, for every  and :
 

Relation to Hilbert spaces 

The following result shows that integral maps "factor through" Hilbert spaces.

Proposition:  Suppose that  is an integral map between locally convex TVS with Y Hausdorff and complete. There exists a Hilbert space H and two continuous linear mappings  and  such that . 

Furthermore, every integral operator between two Hilbert spaces is nuclear. Thus a continuous linear operator between two Hilbert spaces is nuclear if and only if it is integral.

Sufficient conditions 

Every nuclear map is integral.  An important partial converse is that every integral operator between two Hilbert spaces is nuclear.

If  is an integral operator then so is the composition .  

If  is a continuous linear operator between two normed space then   is integral if and only if  is integral.   

Suppose that  is a continuous linear map between locally convex TVSs.  
If  is integral then so is its transpose . Now suppose that the transpose   of the continuous linear map  is integral.

Properties 

Suppose that A, B, C, and D are Hausdorff locally convex TVSs with B and D complete.
Thus, in particular, if  is an infinite-dimensional Fréchet space then a continuous linear surjection  cannot be an integral operator.

See also 

 Auxiliary normed spaces
 Final topology
 Injective tensor product
 Nuclear operators
 Nuclear spaces
 Projective tensor product
 Topological tensor product

References

Bibliography

External links 

 Nuclear space at ncatlab

Topological vector spaces
Topological tensor products
Linear operators